Āryabhaṭa numeration is an alphasyllabic numeral system based on Sanskrit phonemes. It was introduced  in the early 6th century in India by Āryabhaṭa,  in the first chapter titled Gītika Padam of  his  Aryabhatiya. It attributes a numerical value to each syllable of the form consonant+vowel possible in Sanskrit phonology, from  = 1 up to  = 1018.

History 
The basis of this number system is mentioned in the second stanza of the first chapter of Aryabhatiya.

The Varga (Group/Class) letters ka to ma are to be placed in the varga (square) places (1st, 100th, 10000th, etc.) and Avarga letters like ya, ra, la .. have to be placed in Avarga places (10th, 1000th, 100000th, etc.).

The Varga letters ka to ma have value from 1, 2, 3 .. up to 25 and Avarga letters ya to ha have value 30, 40, 50.. up to 100. In the Varga and Avarga letters, beyond the ninth vowel (place), new symbols can be used.

The values for vowels are as follows: a = 1; i = 100; u = 10000;  = 1000000 and so on.

Aryabhata used this number system  for representing both small and large numbers in his mathematical and astronomical calculations.

This system can even be used to represent fractions and mixed fractions.

Example 

The traditional Indian digit order is reversed compared to the modern way. By consequence, Āryabhaṭa began with the ones before the tens; then the hundreds and the thousands; then the myriad and the lakh (105) and so on. (cf. Indian numbering system)

Another example might be  , . Note that in this case, 106(ṛ) and 108(ḷ) parts are swapped, and 106(ṛ) part is ligature.

Numeral table 

In citing the values of Āryabhaṭa numbers, the short vowels अ, इ, उ, ऋ, ऌ, ए, and ओ are invariably used. However, the Āryabhaṭa system did not distinguish between long and short vowels. This table only cites the full slate of क-derived (1 x 10x) values, but these are valid throughout the list of numeric syllables.

See also
 Aksharapalli
 Bhutasamkhya system
 Katapayadi system
 IAST

References

 Kurt Elfering: Die Mathematik des Aryabhata I. Text, Übersetzung aus dem Sanskrit und Kommentar. Wilhelm Fink Verlag, München, 1975, 
 Georges Ifrah: The Universal History of Numbers. From Prehistory to the Invention of the Computer. John Wiley & Sons, New York, 2000, .
 B. L. van der Waerden: Erwachende Wissenschaft. Ägyptische, babylonische und griechische Mathematik. Birkhäuser-Verlag, Basel Stuttgart, 1966, 
 
 

Numerals
Classical ciphers
Indian mathematics